Victor Stînă (born 20 March 1998) is a Moldovan professional footballer who plays as a midfielder for Greek Super League 2 club Panserraikos.

Club career
Stînă made his professional debut for Zimbru in the Divizia Națională on 20 May 2016 against Academia Chișinău, coming on as a 77th-minute substitute.

On 21 September 2018, he signed for Romanian Liga I club Astra Giurgiu.

International career
He has represented Moldova at Under-19 and Under-21 level.

During the qualifiers for the 2021 UEFA European Under-21 Championship, he featured in both the matches that saw Moldova achieve historical home wins against Wales (2–1) and Belgium (1–0).

On June 3 2022 he made his senior international debut in the UEFA Nations League against Liechtenstein. On 25 September 2022 he scored his first goals for Moldova, coming off the bench to score 2 stoppage time goals in a 2-0 win over Liechtenstein

International goals

Personal life
His father, Victor Stînă Sr., is a former football referee.

References

External links
  
Victor Stînă at sports.md

Notes

1998 births
Living people
Moldovan footballers
Association football midfielders
Moldovan Super Liga players
FC Zimbru Chișinău players
FC Sfîntul Gheorghe players
FC Milsami Orhei players
Liga I players
FC Astra Giurgiu players
Panserraikos F.C. players
Liga II players
Super League Greece 2 players
Moldovan expatriate footballers
Moldovan expatriate sportspeople in Romania
Moldovan expatriate sportspeople in Greece
Expatriate footballers in Romania